Liolaemus ramirezae is a species of lizard in the family  Liolaemidae. It is native to Argentina.

References

ramirezae
Reptiles described in 1999
Reptiles of Argentina
Endemic fauna of Argentina